Billbergia reichardtii is a plant species in the genus Billbergia. This species is endemic to Brazil.

Cultivars
 Billbergia 'Wallonia'

References

BSI Cultivar Registry Retrieved 11 October 2009

reichardtii
Endemic flora of Brazil
Flora of the Atlantic Forest
Flora of Espírito Santo
Flora of Minas Gerais